Nils Allesson (Latin: Nicolaus Allonius) was Archbishop of Uppsala  1292–1305.

Biography
According to the Archbishop's Chronicle, he was born in Uppsala.
It is believed that he studied at the University of Paris in 1278. After returning to Sweden, he became deacon in Uppsala in 1286 and was elected archbishop in 1292 following the death of  Archbishop Johannes  who died during  1291.  At this time, the cathedral chapter in Uppsala was in a dispute with Jens Grand, Archbishop of Lund,  who had primate status over the archbishop of Uppsala. The Archbishop did not approve of Nils Allesson and appealed the election to Rome. This occurred during a period without a valid Pope elected due to a deadlock among cardinals. Nils later travelled to Rome to be ordained in 1295 by Pope Boniface VIII. 

Nils was known as a vigorous archbishop. He founded and supervised institutions for safety and order, such as accommodations for travelers around his diocese.
In 1303, he participated in the first trial against Botulf Botulfsson for heresy. The same year, he opened the shrine of Eric the Saint and provided some relics to  Duke Eric Magnusson, the son of King Magnus I of Sweden.

References

External links
Nils Allesson Nordisk familjebok

Other sources
Åsbrink, Gustav & Westman, Knut B. Svea rikes ärkebiskopar från 1164 till nuvarande tid (Bokförlaget Natur och Kultur, Stockholm 1935)

Roman Catholic archbishops of Uppsala
13th-century Roman Catholic archbishops in Sweden
14th-century Roman Catholic archbishops in Sweden
Year of death unknown
Year of birth unknown
People from Uppsala